1504 Lappeenranta, provisional designation , is a stony background asteroid from the inner regions of the asteroid belt, approximately 12 kilometers in diameter. It was discovered on 23 March 1939, by Finnish astronomer Liisi Oterma at the Iso-Heikkilä Observatory, and named after the city of Lappeenranta in Finland.

Orbit and classification 

Lappeenranta is a non-family asteroid from the main belt's background population. It orbits the Sun in the inner asteroid belt at a distance of 2.0–2.8 AU once every 3 years and 9 months (1,358 days). Its orbit has an eccentricity of 0.16 and an inclination of 11° with respect to the ecliptic. The body's observation arc begins four nights prior to its official discovery observation at Turku.

Physical characteristics 

In the Tholen classification, Lappeenranta is a common S-type asteroid. Pan-STARRS photometric survey has also characterized it as an S-type.

Rotation period 

Lappeenranta has an ambiguous rotation period. Recent photometric observations gave a period of 15.16 and 15.190 hours with a brightness variation of 0.09 and 0.22 magnitude, respectively, while Richard Binzel obtained a period of 10.44 hours and an amplitude of 0.29 magnitude in the mid-1980s. An alternative period of 8 hours, which was measured by Laurent Bernasconi and Fernand van den Abbeel (2002) as well as by René Roy (2006), has been superseded.

Diameter and albedo 

According to the surveys carried out by the Infrared Astronomical Satellite IRAS, the Japanese Akari satellite and the NEOWISE mission of NASA's Wide-field Infrared Survey Explorer, Lappeenranta measures between 11.336 and 13.35 kilometers in diameter and its surface has an albedo between 0.1939 and 0.434.

The Collaborative Asteroid Lightcurve Link derives an albedo of 0.1765 and a diameter of 12.65 kilometers based on an absolute magnitude of 11.99.

Naming 

This minor planet was named after the city of Lappeenranta in southeastern Finland. The official  was published by the Minor Planet Center on 20 February 1976.

Notes

References

External links 
 Asteroid Lightcurve Database (LCDB), query form (info )
 Dictionary of Minor Planet Names, Google books
 Asteroids and comets rotation curves, CdR – Observatoire de Genève, Raoul Behrend
 Discovery Circumstances: Numbered Minor Planets (1)-(5000) – Minor Planet Center
 
 

001504
Discoveries by Liisi Oterma
Named minor planets
001504
19390323